Mats-Ola Einar Engborg (born 1 May 1957) is a Swedish wheelchair curler.

Career
He participated at the 2018 Winter Paralympics where Swedish team finished on tenth place.

Teams

References

External links 

 
 Video: 

Living people
1957 births
Swedish male curlers
Swedish wheelchair curlers
Paralympic wheelchair curlers of Sweden
Wheelchair curlers at the 2018 Winter Paralympics
Wheelchair curlers at the 2022 Winter Paralympics
Paralympic medalists in wheelchair curling
Paralympic silver medalists for Sweden
Swedish wheelchair curling champions
Place of birth missing (living people)